Drawing Sword is a 2005 Chinese historical and Second Sino-Japanese War based TV series directed by Zhang Qian and Chen Jian, written by Du Liang and Jiang Qitao, and starring Li Youbin,  and Zhang Guangbei. It is based on the novel Drawing Sword by Du Liang.  The series was first broadcast on CCTV-1 in China from 13 September to 28 September 2005.

Storyline 
The film is based on Du Liang's "Bright Sword", which tells a historical event in the background of China's modern history, from the Second Sino-Japanese War, the Second Nationalist-Communist Civil War to the Korean War. In such a time span, it shows a group of army generals under the leadership of the Chinese Communist Party led by Li Yunlong who fought bloodily and made outstanding war achievements. The film was made after the end of the Communist civil war by Li Yunlong, who praised the merits of the National Army in the frontal battlefield and affirmed the anti-Japanese merits of the Chinese Nationalist Party.

The TV series only filmed the first half of Du Liang's novel "Bright Sword", and episodes such as Li Yunlong's suicide during the Cultural Revolution were not involved.

Cast

Main
 Li Youbin as Li Yunlong
  as Zhao Gang
 Zhang Guangbei as Chu Yunfei

Supporting
 You Li as Kong Jie
 Wang Quanyou as Ding Wei
 Zhang Tong as Wei Dayong
 Liang Linlin as Xiu Qin
 Tong Lei as Tian Yu
 Sun Li as Feng Nan

Music

Awards

References

External links
 

Chinese historical television series
2005 Chinese television series debuts
2005 Chinese television series endings